Adjectival noun may refer to:
Adjectival noun (Japanese), also called adjectival or na-adjective
Noun adjunct, a noun that qualifies another noun, like college in college student
Nominalized adjective, an adjective which has come to function as a noun, as in the rich and the poor

See also
Adjective
Noun (disambiguation)